Scott Myers is an artist.

Scott Myers may also refer to:

Scott Myers (figure skater), competed in 1989 United States Figure Skating Championships
Scott Myers (roller skater), Artistic roller skating at the World Games

See also
Scott Meyers
Scott Meyer (disambiguation)